This is a survey of the postage stamps and postal history of Mongolia.

Mongolia is a landlocked country in East and Central Asia. It is bordered by Russia to the north and the People's Republic of China to the south, east and west. Ulaanbaatar is the capital and largest city.

First posts

The first stamps used in Mongolia were those of Russia from 1858 who operated a number of post offices in the country.

First Mongolian stamps

The first stamps of Mongolia were issued in August 1924 depicting the Vajra, a scepter that is a religious symbol in Buddhism.

The Mongolian People's Republic was proclaimed on November 26, 1924. A new constitution providing for a multi-party system was adopted in 1992.

See also 
Postage stamps and postal history of Tannu Tuva
Mongol Post

References

External links

Stamps of Mongolia since 1945.

Communications in Mongolia
Mongolia